is a Japanese footballer currently playing as a midfielder for Azul Claro Numazu.

Club career
Toyama joined Azul Claro Numazu from Kyoto Sanga ahead of the 2022 season.

International career
Toyama has represented Japan at under-15, under-18 and under-19 level.

Career statistics

Club
.

Notes

References

2003 births
Living people
Association football people from Kyoto Prefecture
Japanese footballers
Japan youth international footballers
Association football midfielders
J3 League players
Kyoto Sanga FC players
Azul Claro Numazu players